The Governor of Badakhshan (Persian: حاکم بدخشان,  hākim-i badakhshān) is the head of the government of Badakhshan. In the late 19th century Badakhshan was joined with Qataghan into a single province and there were governors of Qataghan-Badakhshan Province and Badakhshan District. In 1963 the province was dissolved and Badakhshan became one of the 34 provinces of Afghanistan. Badakhshan province is located in the north-east of the country, between the Hindu Kush and the Amu Darya. The capital of Badakhshan and the seat of the provincial governor is the town of Fayzabad.

Traditionally, Badakhshan was ruled by a mir. In 1859 Badakhshan came under control of the Amir of Afghanistan.  The mirs continued to wield power, but the Amir of Afghanistan appointed a hakim (حاکم), or governor, to rule the province. The title of Hakim was applied to numerous administrative positions in Afghanistan and several positions with different administrative responsibilities could all be called hakim. An example of this is in 1873, when administrative of Badakhshan was placed under the rule of the Hakim of Afghan Turkestan, who in turn appointed a Hakim of Badakhshan. Thus at times the Hakim of Badakhshan has been subservient to the hakim of another region. In 1873 the Mir of Afghanistan also became a pensioner of the Kabul and ceased to hold power in Badakhshan.

In the late 19th century Badakhshan was joined with Qataghan Province into a single province named Qataghan-Badakhshan Province that had a single governor. The capital of Qataghan-Badakhshan Province and seat of the provincial governor was the town of Khan Abad, currently located in Kunduz province. Qataghan and Badakhshan were again divided in 1963 and the capital of Badakhshan reverted to Fayzabad.  Some sources indicate that there may have been more than one governor appointed at a time.

List

See also 

 List of current governors of Afghanistan
 List of mirs of Badakhshan

References 

Badakhshan